Mahurestan-e Olya (also Romanized as Māhūrestān-e ‘Olyā; also known as Māhūrestān-e Bālā and Mūrestān-e ‘Olyā) is a village in Yeylaq Rural District, in the Central District of Buin va Miandasht County, Isfahan Province, Iran. At the 2006 census, its population was 20, in 4 families.

References 

Populated places in Buin va Miandasht County